Listen to Your Heart may refer to:

Film and television
Listen to Your Heart (1983 film), an American romantic comedy
Listen to Your Heart (2010 film), an American romantic drama
The Bachelor Presents: Listen to Your Heart, an American dating reality television series

Music
Listen to Your Heart (album), by DHT, 2005
"Listen to Your Heart" (Lisa Stansfield song), 1983
"Listen to Your Heart" (Roxette song), 1988; covered by DHT, 2004
"Listen to Your Heart" (Sonia song), 1989
"Listen to Your Heart", a song by Alicia Keys from Girl on Fire, 2012
"Listen to Your Heart", a song by Little River Band from Get Lucky, 1990
"Listen to Your Heart", a song by the Maine from Black & White, 2010
"Listen to Your Heart", a song by Rui En, 2003

See also
"Ascolta il tuo cuore" (lit. "Listen to your heart"), a 1997 song by Laura Pausini
"Listen to Your Heartbeat", a song by Friends, representing Sweden at Eurovision 2001
"Stop, Look, Listen (To Your Heart)", a 1971 song by the Stylistics; covered by Marvin Gaye and Diana Ross, 1974
Listen to My Heart (disambiguation)